Niobrara County High School is located in Lusk, Wyoming, United States. Serving students grades 7–12, the high school is governed by Niobrara County School District #1.

Notable alumni 
 James E. Barrett, United States federal judge
 Douglas W. Owsley,  Division Head of Physical Anthropology at the Smithsonian's National Museum of Natural History

References

External links

 Niobara County School District

Buildings and structures in Niobrara County, Wyoming
Education in Niobrara County, Wyoming
Educational institutions in the United States with year of establishment missing
Public high schools in Wyoming